José Enrique Moyal (‎; 1 October 1910 – 22 May 1998) was an Australian mathematician and mathematical physicist who contributed to aeronautical engineering, electrical engineering and statistics, among other fields.

Career
Moyal helped establish the phase space formulation of quantum mechanics in 1949 by bringing together the ideas of Hermann Weyl, John von Neumann, Eugene Wigner, and Hip Groenewold.

This formulation is statistical in nature and makes logical connections between quantum mechanics and classical statistical mechanics, enabling a natural comparison between the two formulations. Phase space quantization, also known as Moyal quantization, largely avoids the use of operators for quantum mechanical observables prevalent in the canonical formulation.
Quantum-mechanical evolution in phase space is specified by a Moyal bracket.

Moyal grew up in Tel Aviv, and attended the Herzliya Hebrew Gymnasium. He studied in Paris in the 1930s, at the École Supérieure d'Electricité, Institut de Statistique, and, finally, at the Institut Henri Poincaré. His work was carried out in wartime England in the 1940s, while employed at the de Havilland Aircraft company. 

Moyal was a professor of mathematics at the former School of Mathematics and Physics of Macquarie University, where he was a colleague of John Clive Ward.  Previously, he had worked at the Argonne National Laboratory in Illinois.

He published pioneering work on stochastic processes.

Personal life
Moyal was married to Susanna Pollack (1912-2000), with whom he had two children, Orah Young (born in Tel Aviv) and David Moyal (born in Belfast). They divorced in 1956. He was married to Ann Moyal from 1962 until his death.

Works
 
 J.E. Moyal, "Stochastic Processes and Statistical Physics" Journal of the Royal Statistical Society B'', 11, (1949), 150–210.

See also
 Moyal bracket
 Wigner–Weyl transform
 Wigner quasiprobability distribution

References

External links
 Maverick Mathematician: The Life and Science of J.E. Moyal
 Obituary by Alan McIntosh and photographs
 Moyal Medal awarded annually by Macquarie University for research contributions to mathematics, physics or statistics

1910 births
1998 deaths
20th-century  Australian mathematicians
Australian physicists
Australian statisticians
Israeli emigrants to Australia
Herzliya Hebrew Gymnasium alumni
Jewish physicists
Academic staff of Macquarie University
Mathematical physicists
People from Jerusalem
Quantum physicists
Mandatory Palestine expatriates in France
Mandatory Palestine expatriates in the United Kingdom